A Lamusi (Mongolian: Almas; 2 June 1989 in Inner Mongolia) is a Southern Mongol judoka who represented China in the men's 60 kg category at the 2012 Summer Olympics, he was defeated in the second round by Javier Guédez.

References

External links 
 
 
 

Chinese male judoka
1989 births
Living people
Olympic judoka of China
Judoka at the 2012 Summer Olympics
Sportspeople from Inner Mongolia
Judoka at the 2010 Asian Games
Medalists at the 2010 Asian Games
Asian Games bronze medalists for China
Asian Games medalists in judo